Ronan Finn (born 21 December 1987) is an Irish professional footballer who plays as a midfielder for Shamrock Rovers in the League of Ireland. He has also played for UCD, Sporting Fingal and Dundalk. Having made over 50 appearances in European competition, Finn competed in the group stages of the Europa League with both Shamrock Rovers (2011) and Dundalk (2016).

Club career
Finn began his youth career at Cambridge United, spending eight months with their youth team in 2004–05. Due to a requirement that he had to finish school in Ireland, he would fly from Dublin to Cambridge after school on Fridays, play a game on Saturday and fly straight back home. Finn scored on his FA Youth Cup debut in a 3–1 victory over Mansfield Town. As the demands to fly over became more frequent from Cambridge United youth manager Ricky Duncan, Finn decided to end his time with the club to instead focus on his education.

UCD
Finn was signed by UCD in 2005 and went straight into the under-21 team. He was a member of the side that won a second straight Dr. Tony O'Neill Under-21 League Championship, scoring the winning goal in the final against Shelbourne. His impressive displays earned him a call-up to the first-team squad towards the end of the season. He made his League of Ireland debut for UCD in a 1–0 defeat against Longford Town in November 2005. He made his home debut the following week on 18 November against Shamrock Rovers, again as a substitute, and also scored his first senior goal in this fixture.

Finn started the 2006 season back in the under-21s. He regularly began to make the match day squad from the beginning of June, making a couple of brief substitute appearances. However he got his chance to impress as he was handed his first senior start away to Sligo Rovers in August and was named the man-of-the-match in this game. He became a regular name on U.C.D. manager Pete Mahon's teamsheet for the remainder of the season. Finn made his FAI Cup debut in the third round against Limerick and scored his first goals of the season in this game, scoring twice in a 3–1 win. His displays did not go unnoticed and he was nominated for the PFAI Young Player of the Year award and also won the UCD Supporters' New Player of the Year.

Finn secured his place as a regular in centre midfield in 2007. He forged a partnership with fellow Irish under-21 international Shane McFaul, helping UCD reach the semi finals of both the League and FAI Cups.

With the retirement of Tony McDonnell and the departure of Shane McFaul in 2008, Finn became one of the most experienced central midfielders at the club and formed a new partnership with Alan McNally in the centre. He began the 2008 season with good form in the opening games against Derry City and Bray Wanderers. UCD struggled, however, as the season went on and were eventually relegated after finishing bottom of the Premier Division.

Following relegation, UCD lost almost all of its first-team squad but Finn decided to remain to complete his degree in Sports Management at the university. Finn was handed the captaincy of this squad by Martin Russell and led them to promotion and the 2009 First Division title. He was subsequently named the PFAI First Division Player of the Year for 2009.

Sporting Fingal
Finn departed UCD after five seasons to join Sporting Fingal on 8 December 2009. He represented the club in the 2010–11 UEFA Europa League qualifying second round against Maritimo.

On 10 February 2011 the directors of Sporting Fingal confirmed that the club withdrew its application for a licence from the FAI to participate in the 2011 Airtricity League season. This decision was taken after funding targets integral to the club's continued existence were not reached during the off-season. After their demise, Finn became a free agent.

Shamrock Rovers
Following the demise of Sporting Fingal, Finn signed for Shamrock Rovers on a two-year deal in February 2011

He made his League debut for the club in the opening night win over Dundalk and helped them win the Setanta Sports Cup by beating Dundalk 2–0 in the final.

In his first season at the club, Finn won the League of Ireland Premier Division and was also a member of the first Irish team to reach the group stage of European competition, as they went on to reach the 2011–12 UEFA Europa League group stages.

Dundalk

In December 2014, Finn signed a two-year deal with Dundalk, linking up with his former boss at Shamrock Rovers, Stephen Kenny. He won the league and cup double at the club in 2015. Following the departure of Richie Towell in December 2015, Finn was played in a more advanced position. His form in this role and a hat-trick against Longford Town on 9 April led to him being named the SWAI League of Ireland Premier Division Player of the Month for the first time in his career in April 2016. Finn played in all 6 of Dundalk's UEFA Champions League qualifying matches as they reached the play-off stage.

Shamrock Rovers return
In December 2016, Finn returned to Shamrock Rovers. On 31 March 2017, he scored his first league goal since his return to the club, in a 3–2 win against Finn Harps at Tallaght Stadium.

International career
Finn was called up to the Republic of Ireland U21 squad for the first time in early 2007, for the annual Madeira Cup tournament. He won his first cap when he came on as a half-time substitute against Madeira. In May 2010, Finn made his Republic of Ireland U23 debut against England C in the 2009–11 International Challenge Trophy game at the Waterford Regional Sports Centre.

Personal life
Finn has a degree in Sports Management from University College Dublin.

Honours

Club
UCD
 League of Ireland First Division: 2009

Shamrock Rovers
 League of Ireland Premier Division: 2011, 2020, 2021, 2022
 FAI Cup: 2019
 President of Ireland's Cup: 2022
 Setanta Sports Cup: 2011, 2013

Dundalk
 League of Ireland Premier Division: 2015, 2016
 FAI Cup: 2015

Individual
 Shamrock Rovers Player of the Year: 2012
 League of Ireland Premier Division Player of the Month: April 2016

References

External links
FAI Stats Portal Profile
Profile Page at Shamrock Rovers

1987 births
Living people
Republic of Ireland association footballers
Republic of Ireland under-21 international footballers
Association football midfielders
Association footballers from Dublin (city)
University College Dublin A.F.C. players
Sporting Fingal F.C. players
Shamrock Rovers F.C. players
Dundalk F.C. players
League of Ireland players
Republic of Ireland under-23 international footballers